Maslow CNC is an open-source CNC router project. It is the only commercially available vertical CNC router and is notable for its low cost of US$500. 

Although the kit is advertised at $500, like many tools, additional initial material and hardware costs are required. The kits are now sold by three re-sellers range in price from $400 to $500. Lumber and plywood are required to make the machine's frame along with an appropriate and compatible router. Lastly, a personal computer or tablet is needed with Windows, Mac OSX or Linux as its operating system. Overall initial material material costs approximately $800. 

The unique vertical design mimics a hanging plotter allowing it to have a 4' x 8' cutting area with a footprint 10' wide x 19" deep. Maslow CNC uses geared motors with encoders (8148 counts/rev) and a closed loop feedback system to achieve a resolution of ±0.4mm. To reduce cost, Maslow CNC comes in kit form, uses a commercial off-the-shelf handheld router provided by the user for the router spindle, uses an Arduino Mega microprocessor, and uses a large number of common hardware items rather than custom parts.

The Maslow CNC project was created 2016 by Bar Smith, Hannah Teagle and Tom Beckett. The project was funded with preorders on Kickstarter, raising $314,000. It was featured on Tested and was shown at Maker Faire Bay Area 2017. 

The original company is no longer selling the kits.

Gallery

References

External links
 Maslow CNC official website
 Maslow CNC Github repository
Numerical control
Open hardware electronic devices